Utchee Creek is a rural locality in the Cassowary Coast Region, Queensland, Australia.

Utchee Creek is a prominent farming town. It has many locally owned banana farms along with various other crops.

References 

Cassowary Coast Region
Localities in Queensland